The 1910 Carlisle Indians football team represented the Carlisle Indian Industrial School as an independent during the 1910 college football season. Led by ninth-year head coach Pop Warner, the Indians compiled a record of 8–6 and outscored opponents 235 to 69.

Schedule

See also
 1910 College Football All-America Team

References

Carlisle
Carlisle Indians football seasons
Carlisle Indians football